The Fire Force manga series features an extensive cast of characters created by Atsushi Ohkubo. Although native form of Japanese name follows the Eastern name order (family name, given name), the characters names in the series follow the Western name order (given name, family name).

Special Fire Force
, also nicknamed , are a firefighting force that was originally formed by members of The Fire Defense Agency, Tokyo Army and The Holy Sol Temple. All eight brigades investigate the Human Combustion Phenomenon and eliminate Infernals whom they administer last rites to.

Special Fire Force Company 8
 is a Special Fire Force located in Tokyo, having the fewest resources and members since it was formed in a rush compared to the other Special Fire Force Companies. While having the same task as the other branches, Company 8's has an additional mission in the observation of the other companies in case any of them are hiding vital information from the entire organization for personal reasons. This allowed them to learn of the White Clad's existence and seek to prevent them from realizing their goals.

Shinra is a Second Class Fire Soldier who joined the Special Fire Force Company 8 to save people as a hero while uncovering the cause of fire that destroyed his family twelve years earlier. The ordeal also caused Shinra to be prone to involuntarily grinning when upset, making him appear menacing while learning to control it. His powers are further enhanced when the Adolla Burst awakened within him, making him able to move at the speed of light while momentarily dissolving his body, thus being revealed as the Fourth of the Eight Pillars that the Evangelist seeks and making him a fourth generation as well. He later trains himself to use that power and his Adolla Link, gradually learning that he was a product of humanity's subconscious desire to oppose the Evangelist while representing humanity’s rage as the Fourth Pillar. He eventually defeats the Evangelist by developing Soul Resonance to use with the perception-altering powers of Adolla to temporary absorb his family to become Shinrabashoman and reboots the world into one ruled by his creation Shinigami, who created Death the Kid in his image years later.

Battalion Captain of Company 8, he is a role-model firefighter and despite being one of its non-powered members, he is at peak human condition and more than willing to get up close and personal with Infernals while battling them, even physically grappling with them at times despite the high risk to himself. Normally calm and cheerful, he can turn furious in an instant should he encounter someone toying with human life. He is also well aware that "putting to rest" Infernals was just a better alternative for the word "killing", thus he warns the younger members of Company 8 never to display their weapons in public, especially when an Infernal's next of kin is around.

Company 8 Lieutenant and a second generation who manipulates his flames through the use of his firearms. He controls the power, speed, and trajectory of the bullets he fires to the point where he can turn the damage output of a normal bullet into that of a tank shell. An extremely intimidating character, he is stoic, strict, and blunt with his words but does care for his allies as shown with his interactions with Shinra after the latter reveals his younger brother's role within the enemy group and is surprisingly a good cook. During his time in the Tokyo Army, he encountered Maki, whom he would later recruit into Fire Force Company 8 after leaving the military, and witnessed the death of his best friend who had suddenly transformed into an Infernal.

A second generation who was a member of the Tokyo army before joining the Special Fire Force to better help others. Her father is General Danro Oze of the Tokyo Imperial Armed Forces and her brother Tagaki is a 1st Lieutenant of the Criminal Investigation Division. While an experienced combatant, Maki uses her second generation powers to create living fireballs which also use to power her Iron Owl projectile weapons. Apart from that, she is also able to control flames from a long distance, allowing her to extinguish, absorb, or force away any form of fire. While she has a gentle demeanor, she can snap if someone comments on her being un-feminine due to her muscular physique, and she is inclined to react aggressively.

One of the two surviving nuns of St. Raffles Convent fire, Iris is a follower of the Holy Sol Temple who joined Company 8 as a medic and is one of its non-powered members. She is adamant in her faith and usually gives prayers to dying Infernals as her way of easing their last moments of suffering. She is also trained in basic first aid. Iris is later revealed by Sister Sumire to be the First Pillar's Doppelgänger, resulting in her gradual awakening as the Eighth Pillar who embodies humanity’s despair.

Arthur is an oblivious third generation with delusions of being a knight king, abandoned by his parents who left to travel the world after their small restaurant burned to the ground. Arthur is an exceptionally strong Fire Soldier due to his Ignition Ability to fabricate and control plasma is fueled by his delusions, becoming more powerful the more detached from reality he is. He channels that power through a sword hilt medium he calls Excalibur, allowing him to cut, wield, and manipulate electricity. His name and abilities are inspired by the legendary British ruler King Arthur.
 Arthur developed a bitter rivalry with Shinra back in their training days that continued after joining the same company and toned down to a more friendly one. During the final battle against the White Clad, his delusions augmented by Adola leaking from the Great Cataclysm, Arthur defeats Dragon in an epic battle that ends with him fatally wounded and drifting out of Earth's orbit while unknowingly infusing life into Excalibur.

Formerly a Fire Soldier and sister of Company 1 until her being an unwitting accessory to Rekka Hoshimiya's crimes got her transferred to Company 8 following her suspension. Tamaki is a third generation whose Ignition Ability, nicknamed "Nekomata" generates pink flames around her in the shape of cat features which she can use for close-range combat or as a signal flare. She has feelings for Shinra after the latter saved her from Rekka. She is cursed to be involved in uncomfortable situations to which she calls "Lucky Lecher Lure Syndrome", which serves as a running gag in the series.

 
Originally Head of Incendiary Research at Haijima Industries before being assigned a position in Company 8 by a government order. Viktor is a brilliant scientist obsessed with the Adolla Burst, and his quest for scientific truth does not deter him from helping Haijima Industries, his new comrades in Company 8, nor prevent him from associating with Joker.

While raised to believe the company stole his family’s Amaterasu plans, Vulcan’s grudge towards Haijima worsened by his grandfather's apprentice Dr. Giovanni working for the company around his grandfather and father mysteriously became Infernals. Vulcan originally wanted nothing to do with the Fire Force and turn down Giovanni's numerous recruitment attempts. It was only after Giovanni stole the Key to Amaterasu which his family guarded for ages that Vulcan breaks his vow and becomes Fire Force Company 8's mechanic to protect his new family and settle things with Giovanni.

Previously an Ashen Flame member under Dr. Giovanni who was code-named , relating to her ability as a Third Generation pyrokinetic to manifest tentacles for various purposes. Traumatized from watching her parents killed by an Infernal, her powers awakened by an Infernal Bug, she created the Lisa Isaribe identity to infiltrate Vulcan's home and find the Key to Amaterasu before exposing herself after her superior decided to get the item personally. Lisa resumed her Ashen Knight duties until Company 8 ventures into the Netherworld, used by Giovanni as a hostage before abandoning her. She joins the Fire Force company 8 soon after, later overcoming her fear of Giovanni to help Vulcan fight him.

Yū is a young boy who works as Vulcan's apprentice in his workshop. When Shinra, Arthur, and Iris try to see Vulcan, they are turned away, but Yū listens to their story and decides to let them in to see Vulcan. Later, Giovanni attacks Yū in order get Vulcan to give him the key to Amaterasu. After the attack, Yū is sent to the hospital to recover and joins Vulcan in Fire Force Company 8 afterwards. During the final battle, Giovanni implanted a parasitic insect into Yū‘s body and takes over after his previous body was destroyed by Vulcan. But Yū is saved by Arthur removing the parasite without any damage on Yū‘s brain.

Special Fire Force Company 1
 is an elite group composed mostly of Holy Sol Temple members with jurisdiction in the Shinjuku District, the religious faith later revealed to have connections to the White Clad.

Battalion Commander of Company 1 who saved Shinra when his mother turned into an Infernal and concealed the truth from him, gradually revealing the event was being caused by the Evangelist. He also wears an eyepatch over his right eye as the result of experiencing an Adolla Link when Joker was his ward, destroying his faith in the Holy Sol Temple as attempted to learn more from researching the long forgotten Netherworld. Later crossing paths with Joker, he redirects him to investigate Haijima Industries for clues of the conspiracy within the Tokyo Empire. After being forced by the Holy See and emperor to work with the Knights of the Ashen Flame, Burns arrests Obi with the intent of turning him into an Infernal. But Burns is defeated by Shinra with Joker supporting the latter, leaving him open to be attacked by a doppelgänger Infernal manifesting from his shadow.

A Second Generation whose ability is to convert heat energy into sound energy via a special music instrument which he can then convert into ice which he uses to attack or freeze an opponent. He has an odd speech pattern wherein he uses the same or a similar word as both a verb and a noun in the same sentence (ex. "this trouble is quite troubling"), but is determined and dedicated to the Fire Force's cause.

The main priest of Company 1 who was injured by Arrow in the line of duty. Huo Yan is a Third Generation pyrokinetic which grants him the ability to generate his own flames. Using hand-to-hand combat in conjunction with his Ignition Ability, he is capable of killing Infernal's with ease, using very quick and precise movements. He has shown to be a powerful combatant despite having lost his right arm.

A retired Fire Soldier who resumed his position in Company 1 following Rekka's death and Li's injury. Despite being forced out of retirement, Onyango is perfectly willing to embrace his old role. Even ready to take part in a photo-shoot for the Firefighter’s Calendar. His relationship with Leonard Burns means that Onyango has a great understanding of what drives the enigmatic and stoic captain, while Burns and the other members of Company 1 appear to hold him in a high regard. Onyango alongside Company 1 and Leonard, attended the incident involving Mari Kusakabe's house being on fire.

Special Fire Force Company 2
 is composed of militants who answer to the Tokyo Armed Forces.

The Battalion Commander of Company 2 and a Third Generation who can produce flames from his scalp, making his headbutts incredibly destructive.

 
A Third Generation pyrokinetic from the Chinese Peninsula is also called Juggernaut because of his huge padded uniform. He can form his flames into various forms of weaponry, usually explosives like missiles. Ironically, he is pyrophobic despite having powers and only enlisted in the Fire Force as a means of overcoming his fears.

Special Fire Force Company 3
 is one of two Fire Force Companies that is heavily influenced by Haijima Industries. The most corrupted and callous Fire Force Company out of the eight, it was infiltrated by agents of the Evangelist (led by Dr. Giovanni) until the latter was forced to flee. The scandal was covered up by Haijima Industries, but many members of Company 3 left to follow Dr. Giovanni, implying that majority of its members were infiltrators.

Special Fire Force Company 4
 answers to the Fire Defense Agency and is initially structured like a normal fire brigade while supervising the Special Fire Force Training School.

Battalion Commander of Company 4. Formerly a skilled and devoted Fire Soldier, the Adolla Link he experienced two years prior warped his personality into one of instability and masochism, obsessed with experiencing Adolla again. He is targeted by the White-Clad due to his link, and is eventually murdered by them.

An instructor at the Special Fire Brigade Training School and a Third Generation who can increase people's heat resistance.

A Third Generation and classmate of both Shinra and Arthur, his Ignition Ability allows him to create fire spears and literally tattoo fire onto his own body to augment his physical abilities.

Special Fire Force Company 5
 is one of two Fire Force Companies that is heavily influenced by Haijima Industries due to the research conducted by Hibana. It is stationed at the 5th Special Fire Fighting Industrial Complex in Tokyo.

Company 5's Battalion Commander and scientist, she is one of the surviving nuns of the St. Raffles Convent fire alongside Iris. Compared to Iris, whom she values as family, the ordeal made Hibana a sadistic atheist as she offered her services to Haijima Industries in order to rise up the ranks. Being initially antagonistic to Company 8 until her defeat by Shinra made her an ally to the group, as well as develop feelings for Shinra. As a third generation kinetic able to manipulate heat, her Ignition Ability  allows her to create and manipulate flower-like flames that burn on contact.

A sardonic rookie member of Company 5 whose Third Generation pyrokinesis allows him to fill bubblegum balloons with flammable gas, which explode once popped. He calls this his "Backdraft Bubblish Gum." He is also quite resourceful on the battlefield, as he was able to find the perfect hiding spot from which he could attack whilst not being able to be injured by Takehisa Hinawa's bullets.
Tokuyama

A group of fifteen women that appear in threes, all being identically dressed female Fire Soldiers with one of them being a Third Generation pyrokinetic.

A murderous firefighter who turned into an Infernal during his trial where he was found innocent, going on a rampage until being defeated by Shinra and taken by Company 5 for experimentation. He later participates in the fight between Companies 5 and 8 where he is destroyed by Arthur.

Special Fire Force Company 6
 is a branch of the Fire Force which specializes in medical treatment and tends to the care of those with ignition abilities who are injured during their duties.

Battalion Commander of Company 6 and a doctor. She is a Third Generation pyrokinetic and uses her Ignition Ability to the create serpent-like flaming Rod of Ascepius so she can heal others of injuries and diseases in addition to eliminating pain felt during the procedure.

Lieutenant and nurse, she is also a Second Generation pyrokinetic, and granddaughter of Sōichirō Hague.

Special Fire Force Company 7
 is a branch of Fire Force based in the Asakusa district that started out as a vigilante firefighting corps until they were given official recognition by authorities and reformed into a new Fire Force Company.

 
Battalion Commander of Company 7. He is a hybrid Second and Third Generation with a volatile personality and capable of unleashing devastating fire-power. He normally has a laconic expression and has one concentric circular and one cross-shaped pupil.

Second in command of Company 7 at the time of its authentication, previously its captain.

Twin sisters whose Third Generation pyrokinesis allows them to shroud themselves in fox-like cloaks, cute in appearance yet mischievous in personality with a sadistic streak whenever beating bad guys up.

Tokyo Empire

The current ruler of the Tokyo Empire, though Burns speculates that it may be an impostor working with the White Clad as Yona assumed the identity of Raffles I to establish the Holy Sol Temple.

The founding ruler of the Tokyo Empire, mentioned in the Holy Sol scripture to have used the Adolla Burst and Amaterasu to rebuild civilization following the Great Catacylsm. But in reality, his full name Raffles Smith, he was murdered by Yona with the entity assuming his identity and fabricating the story. A Adolla Doppelgänger of Raffles appears as a giant Infernal when the Second Great Cataclysm commences, attacking the city before Shinra kills him.

Haijima Industries

President of Haijima Industries, the most powerful entity in the Tokyo Empire after the Holy Sol Temple is developed the Amaterasu and controls most of the economy with about 70% of the population under its employ. A shrewd man who neither wastes time or let his feelings cloud his judgment, Gureo is aware of the First Pillar yet makes the Tokyo Empire's prosperity his main priority. He instructs Viktor Licht to spy on Company 8 to observe Shinra, who he requests following the Chinese Peninsula. Following the chaos that later ensured, Gureo agrees to offer his support to Company 8 after they promise to provide him with an alternate power source for the Amaterasu so it would not be powered by a human sacrifice. Despite this, he still wishes to study the Adolla Burst through experimenting on Nataku and Shinra.

He is a Third Generation pyrokinetic whose main task is testing the pyrokinetic abilities of promising children at Haijima Industries, having a reputation of being utterly insane due to his sheer obsession to brutalize weaklings above everything else. But Yūichirō is tolerated by Haijima for his effectiveness as he ends up becoming an unofficial guardian to Nataku, whom the boy refers to as Uncle Reaper. His lower right arm is carbonised through overheating and he uses it to create and control "black smoke" which he can use to hide himself, detect the movements of opponents or harden into weapons or other objects to attack his opponents.

She is in charge of educating children who do not yet know how to use their pyrokenetic abilities. She is a second generation pyrokenetic and controls small powerful robotic characters called "Dominions". 

Called  by friends, he is a child residing in Tokyo before Rekka subjected him to an Infernal Bug that awakened him into a Third Generation able to ignite his right arm into a claw with his mindset effecting his level of power. He was placed in the custody of Haijima Industries, with the experiments conducted by Kurono and the trauma from his ordeal awakens him as the Sixth Pillar, an embodiment of fear whose Adolla Burst causes him to emit radioactive energy when stressed. When the White Clad attempt to capture Nataku, the stress causes him to emit radioactive energy that is harmful to normal humans and potent enough to destroy the entire Tokyo Empire. Once Nataku is calmed and returned to Hajima, he is placed under Kurono’s care as he is the only adult who doesn’t place impossible standards upon the boy.

Knights of the Ashen Flame
The Evangelist's followers are provided with Adolla-infused Infernal Bugs that enter the host and cause them to be merged with a Doppelgänger, a being from the Adolla realm who is a reflection of their human counterpart as society sees them. The result either creates an Infernal or awakens the host's potential as a pyrokinetic with an Adolla Burst. The White Clad's headquarters are located in the Nether, a forbidden area beneath the Tokyo Empire consisting of abandoned subway tunnels where the sun never shines. While Doppelgängers are normally brought to the world via the creation of Infernals through their human counterparts, they can also be summoned through a ritual by the White Clad in their own physical bodies regardless if their human counterpart is alive or dead.

The Evangelist is a mysterious female entity who is the embodiment of despair that resides in the Apollo realm and influenced humanity from the shadows. But her plan is foiled when Shinra restores the world and destroys her after being purged from Haumea.

 
Her exact origins unknown, wearing a golden crown over her eyes, Haumea was born with an Adolla Burst in form of hearing humanity's collective unconsciousness that gradually eroded her sanity from being tormented from hearing peoples’ darkest thoughts. After sensing Burns's Doppelgänger manifested, Haumea instructs the White Clad to kill off every Fire Soldier but the Pillars. As the Great Catalyst begins, Haumea discards her crown while proceeding to sacrifice the Pillars and become a vessel to the manifesting Evangelist. But Shinra manages to convince Haumea to let go of the despair driving her as she is reunited with Charon. In the epilogue, she and Charon get married.

Shō was abducted by the Knights of the Ashen Flame's leadership then raised and indoctrinated by the Evangelist to play a role in the figure's plan. As the Third Pillar, his Adolla Burst allows him to manipulate the universe's thermal expansion, giving the illusion that he can freeze time to a standstill. He eventually escapes Haumea's brainwashing and starts searching for his brother, and at the process, indirectly betraying the group alongside Arrow. Upon learning he is a product of humanity's subconscious desire to guide Shinra to his purpose as the hero, Shō allies himself with Shinra to oppose the White Clad.

A plague mask-wearing member of the White Clad, descended from one of the two families that created the Amaterasu reactor per the Evangelist’s design and established Haijima Industries to oversee it after the Joseph family broke ties with them. Having developed an interest in the Infernal Bugs, Giovanni turned himself into an insect creature that uses host bodies to prolong his life so he can witness the world engulfed in Adolla. In his result host body, Giovanni posed as an apprentice to Vulcan's grandfather to recover Amaterasu's key from the Joseph family before working for Haijima while arranging him and Vulcan's father to be turned into Infernals. He joins the White Clad after taking Amaterasu's key from Vulcan as the host body he modified into a cyborg gradually becomes more insect-like. Once preparations for the Cataclysm were completed, Giovanni proceeds to unlock the reactor core with Charon, Ritsu, and Dragon. While Giovanni’s body is destroyed by Vulcan and Lisa, he implanted a parasitic insect holding his consciousness into Yu’s brain to complete his mission. But Giovanni is destroyed for good by Arthur using Excalibur to extract the parasite with Yu unharmed.

A White-Clad member who normally serves as Shō's bodyguard, composed and loyal to the organization's cause. As a Third Generation pyrokinetic, she ignites her left arm to create a bow and arrow of flames which combined with her eyesight makes her ideal as a long-range combatant and sniper. Despite her loyalty to the White Clad, she leaves it to follow Shō and allies with Company 8 on his orders.

A White-Clad member who serves as Haumea's bodyguard and guardian, a Second Generation pyrokinetic who absorb and convert kinetic energy into thermal energy to unleash explosive attacks. Despite Haumea's abuse, Charon cares for her like a daughter and desires to cause a second Great Cataclysm to end her suffering. As Haumea proceeds to cause the event, Charon sacrifices himself to buy her time by overloading his body with numerous hits to launch a final devastating attack on Company 8. However, Shinra uses his powers as Shinrabashoman to resurrect Charon so he can help reach Haumea.

A member of the Ashen Flames who is among the White Clad's oldest members despite his youthful appearance, revealed to originate from the Adolla before appearing on Earth in the aftermath of the Great Cataclysm. A self-styled artist whose Third Generation pyrokinesis allows him to rearrange a person's face, Yona used this ability to establish the Holy Sol faith under the guise of Raffles I two centuries before the events of the series while acquiring the First Pillar. Yona's abilities also allow him to create convincing disguises for his subordinates to cause chaos such as during the Asakusa incident. Yona oversees the final phases of Cataclysm as it reaches its zenith, consumed in the flames while believing he can finally return to Adolla.

An infamous Fire Thief who saves people from fires in exchange for their valuables, calling herself a fourth generation for being about to smell the likely pathway of any heat source like a fire's pattern of spreading. Despite the Fire Force's attempts to recruit her, Inca joins the White Clad for the excitement and willingly allowed herself to be sacrificed for their cause. After being revived by Shinra, Inca loses her pryokinesis and ends up becoming one of the first Witches in the rebooted world that Shinra created.

A member of the Holy Sol Temple, Sumire was originally a normal businesswoman who became disillusioned with humanity and became a Pillar to cause the Great cataclysm. As the Seventh Pillar, embodying disgust, Sumire's pyrokinesis allows her to turn the heat produced from the muscle reflex vibrations into kinetic energy potent enough to destroy metal. Having spent years searching for the other Pillars, Sumire was presumed to have died in the burning of St. Raffles Convent where she conducted experiments involving Doppelgänger-type Infernals. She makes her presence known when Company 8 saves Obi and takes her place in the White Clad as preparations for the second Great Cataclysm are complete and offers her life for its fruition, choosing not to return to the living. 

 
A White-Clad member who infiltrated Company 1 so he can find people with the Adolla Burst while secretly creating Infernals using Infernal Bugs, hinted of being behind the fire that destroyed Iris's orphanage. He was eventually discovered and captured by Karim after being pushed to his limit by Shinra, but quickly silenced by Arrow moments later. As a Third Generation pyrokinetic, he uses his flames to augment his karate fighting style and inflict blows strong as fired rockets.

A member of the Ashen Flame who is previously serves as Arrow's partner before eating an Infernal Bug during the Asakusa incident, turning himself into a Demon-type Infernal which Benimaru destroys.

A middle-aged member of the Ashen Flame who has the ability to create a flaming spiked ball at the end of a chain. He infiltrated Company 3 of the Fire Force and was sent by Giovanni with Mirage to kill Vulcan. Flail is later defeated by Maki during Company 8's venture into the Nether.

A young member of the Ashen Flame who has the ability to create multiple illusions of people. He infiltrated Company 3 of the Fire Force and was sent by Giovanni with Flail to kill Vulcan. Mirage is later defeated by Arthur during Company 8's venture into the Nether.

Assault was dispatched to deal with Company 8 when they entered the Nether and attacks Iris and Tamaki Kotatsu in the Netherworld after they got separated from their group. After being defeated by Tamaki in a humiliating fashion, Assault vowed to defeat her while gradually realizing he is developing feeling for her.

She can manipulate dead bodies through her ability Necro Pyro, allowing her to reanimate corpses as her personal army or serve as materials to augment an Infernal. Ritsu aids in the final phases of Cataclysm as it reaches its zenith and is consumed in the resulting flames.

A Third Generation pyrokinetic who is the leader of the White-Clad's Butchers, being powerful enough to resist Arthur's sword Excalibur at maximum power and make Benimaru doubtful of being able to defeat him. He is among the White Clad's oldest members, having been recruited by Faerie while wandering the Middle East. He possesses the ability to create armor which assumes a dragon-like form similar to a Demon Infernal in appearance. Dragon developed an interest in Arthur as the two engage each other in battle. Following the beginning of the Second Great Cataylsm, he and Arthur engage in a final battle on the moon which results in his death while simultaneously experiencing hope for the first time in his life.

A seemingly composed Third Generation pyrokinetic whose Adolla Burst allows him to manipulate gravity at an atomic level in various ways like flight and countering the Kusakabe brothers' Adolla Bursts. He is among the White-Clad's oldest members as overseer of the Great Cataclysm Execution Specialist Force, having manipulated humanity from the shadows for centuries to ensure the Second Great Cataclysm occurs. When Arthur manages to kill Dragon while disrupting the Great Cataclysm, and after the Kusakabe brothers preventing him from pulling the moon into Earth's orbit, Faerie and his followers commit suicide to summon Doppelgängers of the strongest Fire Force members in a final gambit to ensure the Great Cataclysm resumes.

 Her real name Amaterasu, she is the survivor of the Great Catalysm whom Yona found her after she awakened as the First Pillar and had her sealed in within the Amaterasu reactor to serve as a means to restart civilization to arrange a second Great Catalysm. The centuries-long isolation made Amaterasu resentful towards mankind as their collective subconscious eventually created her Doppelgänger Iris, influencing Shinra at times to give into his own resentment. After the second Great Catalysm is prevented after being sacrificed for it, Amaterasu decided to remain dead so Iris can live a full life in her stead.

Chinese Peninsula
The Chinese Peninsula is on the continent west of Tokyo and contains fragile dry land. For two hundred and fifty years after the Great Disaster, Infernals have wandered areas of the peninsula.

The mysterious girl is a third generation pyrokinetic who acquired an Adolla Burst during the Great Cataclysm after being bitten by Evangelist's Infernal Bug. She arrived at the peninsula from the Tear in Space after the Great Disaster and granted the surrounding animals both sapience and immortality. She repaired the  reactor to serve as power source which created the Oasis and made it habitable. Two centuries after entering the Tabernacle, the severity of her burns from being inside increased her Adolla presence. She communicated with Shinra via the Adolla Link to protect the Oasis from Tempeh and gave Shinra a one-second use of Divine Protection. Later she revealed her history and relationship with the Evangelist.

A talking mole who was among the animals granted sapience and immortality by the Black Lady.

A survivor of the Great Cataclysm, Tempeh ventured to the Tear in Space where he encountered the Evangelist. He became an Infernal while retaining his consciousness, but centuries of unending pain drove Tempe insane as he became consumed by a desire to die at any cost. He gained a following of other sentient Infernals whom he ordered to collect stone tablets to destroy the Tabernacle. The resulting explosion set their souls free, but the appearance of the Fire Force resulted in his death while fighting Shinra.

Other characters

A wanted criminal and third generation pyrokinetic, he was inducted as a member of the Shadow of the Holy Sun assassins at a young age and designated as "5-2". He was placed under Leonard Burns as encounter with an Infernal caused them to experience an Adolla Link, losing his left eye while gaining an interest to uncover the truth of the world concealed by the Tokyo Empire. As he escaped the organization and formed an alliance with Viktor Licht, Joker expressed an interest in Shinra since their first meeting, providing him with information regarding his family's tragedy and assisting Company 8 at times. He later offers his help to Company 8 after they are labeled outlaws of the Tokyo Empire, assisting Shinra in saving Obi and facing Burns.

 Mari is the mother of Shinra and Sho, both revealed to be parthenogenetic births that the Holy Sol covered up. Mari ends up being turned into a Demon Infernal when Sho awakens his Adolla Burst, blinding herself upon gazing at the Evangelist before spiriting Sho to the White Clad. She was declared dead in the aftermath. Mari later appears to aid Shinra against the Evangelist and Haumea, revealed to be the Evangelist’s doppelgänger as an embodiment of hope in physical form.

References

Fire Force